Siniša Kovačić (born 3 August 1977) is a former Croatian heavyweight kickboxer fighting out of Varaždin, Croatia.

Career
He started training martial arts with ten years, first karate, savate and later kickboxing, becoming Croatian champion in six disciplines: kickboxing, Muay Thai, Savate, full contact, boxing and K-1.

Titles
2012 WKF World Full Muay Thai Rules Super Lightweight Champion -62,3 kg
2011 WKN World Kickboxing Super Bantamweight Champion -58,5 kg
2011 WKF World K-1 Rules Super Lightweight Champion -62,3 kg
2010 WPKC World Kickboxing Champion -59 kg
2009 W.A.K.O. Pro Intercontinental Full-Contact Bantamweight Champion -56,4 kg
2008 W.A.K.O. Pro European Full-Contact Featherweight Champion -58,2 kg
2002 European Savate Champion -60 kg (Defeated Guennady Maksimov)
Mediterranean Savate Champion
24X Croatian Champion (Boxing, Kickboxing (Low-Kick, Full-Contact, K-1), Muay Thai, Savate)

Kickboxing record

|-  style="background:#cfc;"
| 2012-12-22 || Win ||align=left| Janos Vass || Grand Fight - Simply the Best || Sračinec, Croatia || KO || 2 || 
|-
! style=background:white colspan=9 |
|-  style="background:#cfc;"
| 2011-05-28 || Win ||align=left| Gerard Linder || Grand Fight || Varaždin, Croatia || Decision (Unanimous) || 5 || 3:00  
|-
! style=background:white colspan=9 |
|-  style="background:#cfc;"
| 2011-04-30 || Win ||align=left| Jeton Zejna || Charity Fight Night || Kloten, Switzerland || Decision (Unanimous) || 5 || 3:00  
|-
! style=background:white colspan=9 |
|-  style="background:#cfc;"
| 2010-06-19 || Win ||align=left| Tibor Tocsan ||  || Čakovec, Croatia ||  ||  || 
|-
! style=background:white colspan=9 |
|-  style="background:#cfc;"
| 2009-04-11 || Win ||align=left| Nikolay Ride || The Night of Pitt Bull 2 || Sračinec, Croatia || Technical decision (Unanimous) || 7 ||  
|-
! style=background:white colspan=9 |
|-  style="background:#fbb;"
| 2008-12-27 || Loss ||align=left| Daniel Martins || Grand Fight || Varaždin, Croatia || Decision (Split) || 12 || 2:00 
|-
! style=background:white colspan=9 |
|-  style="background:#fbb;"
| 2008-07-26 || Loss ||align=left| Lorenzo Fiaola || Kickboxing Night || Rome, Italy || TKO (Injury) || 4 || 2:00 
|-
! style=background:white colspan=9 |
|-  style="background:#cfc;"
| 2008-05-18 || Win ||align=left| Lorenzo Fiaola ||  || Varaždin, Croatia ||  ||  ||   
|-
! style=background:white colspan=9 |
|-  style="background:#fbb;"
| 2007-12 || Loss ||align=left| Rocco Cipriano ||  || Wohlen, Switzerland || Decision || 12 || 2:00  
|-
! style=background:white colspan=9 |
|-  style="background:#cfc;"
| 2006-04-29 || Win ||align=left| Mate Bebić || Confrontation in the Ring IV  || Split, Croatia || TKO || 3 || 
|-
| colspan=9 | Legend:

See also
List of WAKO Amateur World Championships
List of WAKO Amateur European Championships
List of male kickboxers

References

Living people
1985 births
Croatian male kickboxers
Croatian Muay Thai practitioners
Sportspeople from Varaždin